The Boy Who Grew Too Fast is a "one-act opera for young people" with music and libretto by Gian-Carlo Menotti. It was first performed by OperaDelaware at the Grand Opera House in Wilmington, Delaware, on September 24, 1982.

Roles

References

Operas by Gian Carlo Menotti
English-language operas
One-act operas
Operas
1982 operas
Children's operas